Widowermaker is the third studio EP by American punk band Butthole Surfers, released in September 1989. All songs were written by Butthole Surfers.

This was the band's last release on Touch and Go Records.

Track listing
 "Helicopter" – 6:47
 "Bong Song" – 3:41
 "The Colored F.B.I. Guy" – 2:46
 "Booze, Tobacco, Dope, Pussy, Cars" – 2:19

UK edition
The UK edition, on Blast First, was originally released on 10" vinyl. It was later reissued on a mini CD with a plastic clip-on cover to fit in all CD players.

It has the same tracks with slightly different names and in a different order to the US release.

 "Bon Song"
 "1401"
 "Booze Tobacco"
 "Helicopter"

"1401" is the true name of "The Colored FBI Guy", as it is always used on set lists. The name is a reference to the address of the house that Butthole Surfers lived in at the time.

Personnel
 Gibby Haynes  – lead vocals
 Paul Leary  – guitar
 Jeff Pinkus – bass
 King Coffey  – drums

Charts

References

1989 EPs
Butthole Surfers albums
Touch and Go Records EPs
Blast First EPs
UK Independent Singles Chart number-one singles